Zeno is the single German-language periodical devoted specifically to work at the intersection of philosophy and literature, featuring essays, reviews, stories and poems. Since 1980, it has been published annually by Rhine-Ruhr University Press (Universitätsverlag Rhein-Ruhr | UVRR).

Name 
The periodical's name refers to the ancient philosophers Zeno of Elea (c. 490 – 430 BCE), the presocratic, and Zeno of Kition (c. 333/332 – 262/261 BCE), the Stoic.

Editors 
Zeno is edited by Gerd Brudermüller, Jakob Ossner, Michael Rumpf und Joachim Vahland. Until his death in 2011, Wolfgang Marx, professor of philosophy at the University of Bonn, served as co-editor.

Topic foci 
Recent issues of Zeno were devoted to the following topics:
 2017 | no. 37: Tolerance
 2016 | no. 36: Conflicts
 2015 | no. 35: Identity II
 2014 | no. 34: More or Less
 2013 | no. 33: Identity I
 2012 | no. 32: Equality
 2011 | no. 31: Values
 2010 | no. 30: Individuals

Authors 
Among authors who have published in Zeno are Andreas Dorschel, Wilhelm Genazino, Panagiotis Kondylis, Helmut Krausser, Brigitte Kronauer, Günter Kunert, Reiner Kunze and Gabriele Wohmann. The periodical has also re-published texts by, i.a., Henri-Frédéric Amiel, Gustav Theodor Fechner, Walter Savage Landor, Paul Léautaud, Antonio Machado, Heinrich Rickert, Marcel Schwob, Walter Serner and Georg Simmel.

External links 
 Homepage of Zeno
 Zeno in titel kulturmagazin

References 

German-language journals
Annual journals
Publications established in 1980